Alexander Otto (born 7 July 1967) is a German billionaire businessman. As of November 2021, his net worth was estimated at US$12.2 billion.

Early life
Alexander Otto was born on 7 July 1967. He is son of Werner Otto and his third wife, Maren Otto. He earned a bachelor's degree from Harvard College, and an MBA from Harvard Business School.

Career
Otto is a part-owner of Otto Group, founded by his father Werner Otto. He is the majority owner and CEO of ECE Group, a commercial property company specialising in shopping centres, which was also founded by his father. He has joined the family business in 1994.

He is also a member of the supervisory board of the Otto Group, of Deutsche EuroShop AG and of SITE Centers in Cleveland/USA.

According to the magazine Forbes his net worth is $12.1 Billion. The Otto family is consistently ranked among the wealthiest Germans.

Personal life
Otto is married to Dorit Otto and lives in Hamburg, Germany.

References

1967 births
Living people
Harvard College alumni
Harvard Business School alumni
Businesspeople from Hamburg
German billionaires
German chief executives
Otto family
20th-century German businesspeople
21st-century German businesspeople